PGC 13809 is a spiral, almost edge-on galaxy in the constellation Fornax.  It was discovered by the European Southern Observatory and it is a member of the Fornax Cluster.

PGC 13809 has a Hubble classification of Sc, indicating it is an unbarred spiral galaxy with loose spiral arms. It is also seen nearly edge-on, with an angle of about ≈80 degrees (≈80°). Its size on the night sky is 4.8' x 0.8', indicating a real size of about 90,000 light-years, so PGC 13809 is slightly smaller than the Milky Way. It is also one of the larger galaxies in the Fornax Cluster, a cluster of 200 galaxies. Its magnitude is 12.6.

With a redshift of 1838 km/s, it is one of the faster moving galaxies in the Fornax Cluster, but it is close to the central giant elliptical galaxy NGC 1399, so gravitational reaction is possible.

References 

Fornax Cluster
Spiral galaxies
Fornax (constellation)